"" was the anthem of the People's Republic of the Congo from January 1, 1970 through 1991, when the original anthem, "La Congolaise", was restored.

The anthem was named after a three-day uprising in 1963 that resulted in the overthrow of the first President, Fulbert Youlou.

The lyrics were written by Henri Lopès, and the music was composed by Philippe Mockouamy. Mockouamy was at the time a colonel in the Congolese Army and served in its main military band from 1970 to 1990.

Lyrics

Notes

References

 Congo, Republic of "Les Trois Glorieuses"
 People's Republic of the Congo "Les Trois Glorieuses"

History of the Republic of the Congo
Republic of the Congo music
Historical national anthems
National symbols of the Republic of the Congo
African anthems
Republic of the Congo songs